SM U-27 or U-XXVII was the lead boat of the  of U-boats or submarines for the Austro-Hungarian Navy. U-27 was built by the Austrian firm of Cantiere Navale Triestino (CNT) at the Pola Navy Yard and launched on 19 October 1916. She was commissioned on 24 February 1917.

She displaced nearly  when surfaced and over  when submerged. She was armed with two bow torpedo tubes and could carry a load of up to four torpedoes. She was also equipped with a  deck gun and a machine gun.

During her service career, U-27 sank the British destroyer , damaged the Japanese destroyer , and sank or captured 34 other ships totaling . U-27 was surrendered at Pola at war's end and handed over to Italy as a war reparation in 1919. She was broken up the following year. Conway's All the World's Fighting Ships 1906–1921 calls U-27 Austria-Hungary's "most successful submarine".

Design and construction 

After these steps alleviated their most urgent needs, the Austro-Hungarian Navy selected the German Type UB II design for its newest submarines in mid 1915. The Germans were reluctant to allocate any of their wartime resources to Austro-Hungarian construction, but were willing to sell plans for up to six of the UB II boats to be constructed under license in Austria-Hungary. The Navy agreed to the proposal and purchased the plans from AG Weser of Bremen.

U-27 displaced  surfaced and  submerged. She was capable of  while surfaced and  while submerged. U-27 class boats were designed for a crew of 23–24.

U-27 was armed with two  bow torpedo tubes and carried a complement of four torpedoes. She was also equipped with a 75 mm/26 (3.0 in) deck gun and an  machine gun.

After intricate political negotiations to allocate production of the class between Austrian and Hungarian firms, U-27 was ordered from Cantiere Navale Triestino (CNT) on 12 October 1915. She was laid down by early 1916 at the Pola Navy Yard, and launched on 19 October.

Service career 
After her completion, U-27 was commissioned into the Austro-Hungarian Navy on 24 February 1917 under the command of Linienschiffsleutnant Robert Teufl von Fernland.
In April, von Fernland and U-27 both achieved their first kills. On 12 April, U-27 encountered the 3,756 GRT Greek steamship Niritos sailing from Genoa for Port Said. Four days later, von Fernland torpedoed another Greek steamer, the 2,976 GRT Zinovia. Carrying coal from Barry for Taranto, Zinovia was sent to the bottom  from Cape Rizzuto.

In mid-May 1917, U-27 participated in a support role in a raid on the Otranto Barrage that precipitated the Battle of Otranto Straits. U-27, which was assigned to patrol between Brindisi and Cattaro, was a part of a force of three U-boats intended to intercept British and Italian ships responding to the attacks; the other two were the Austro-Hungarian  (which was posted near Valona) and the German  (assigned to mine Brindisi). A squadron of British cruisers and Italian and French destroyers joined the battle against the Austro-Hungarian cruisers on 15 May. Several ships on each side were damaged by the time the engagement was broken off. As a result of the attacks the drifter line of the Barrage was moved farther south and maintained only during the day, a success for the Central Powers. U-27 did not take any offensive action during the raid and ensuing battle.

On 9 June, U-27 sank Roland, a French sailing ship, off the Greek island of Cerigo. Two days later, von Fernland torpedoed the Japanese destroyer  between Cerigotto and Meles. Sakaki was one of eight s that were part of the Japanese contribution to the Allied effort in the Mediterranean. Although the Japanese ships often performed escort service for British troop convoys, Helgason does not report whether Sakaki was engaged in that duty when she was attacked. Even though 68 Japanese sailors perished in the attack, nearly two-thirds the complement of a typical Kaba-class ship, Sakaki remained afloat, was repaired, and remained in service. On 29 December, Linienschiffsleutnant Josef Holub replaced von Fernland as commander of U-27. Holub recorded his first victory with U-27 in January 1918. While near Marca, Sirocco, the U-boat torpedoed and sank the Italian steamer Andrea Costa on 22 January. The 3,991 GRT Andrea Costa had sailed from Rangoon, but was sunk just short of her destination of Malta. A little more than four months would pass before Holub and U-27 would score their next success.

From late April to early May, U-27 sank six small ships—five Greek and one Italian—including three on one day, 6 May. All of the ships with reported tonnages were under 50 GRT. U-27 torpedoed the British destroyer  at 09:18 on 14 May with the loss of one stoker and one artificer. Phoenix had been attached to the group of ships patrolling the Otranto Barrage when she was torpedoed amidships on the starboard side. Although she survived the initial attack, Phoenix was listing badly and taking on large quantities of water. An attempt was made by Australian destroyer  to tow Phoenix to safety but by 12:45 she was in danger of capsizing and her crew were removed. Phoenix eventually sank at 13:10 in position . From 3 to 11 July, U-27 sank another nine ships, the largest reported being the 53 GRT sailing vessel  Tris Adelphi. U-27 dispatched three of the ships on 3 July, and sank two each on 10 and 11 July. On 13 August, U-27 attacked the 2,209 GRT British steamer Anhui. Four persons on Anhui died when the ship with her general cargo went down.

U-27s next victims were all encountered in mid-September. On 11 September, the French sailing ship Antoinette was seized as a prize and towed into the port of Beyrouth. Starting three days later, Holub and U-27 sent an additional twelve small ships to the bottom, including the final six all on 20 September. Except for the two largest ships—the 113 GRT Agios Nicolas and the 103 GRT Theologos—none were over 60 GRT.

At the war's end, U-27 was in port at Pola. The U-boat was surrendered to Italy as a war reparation in 1919 and was scrapped at Fiume in 1920. In addition to the sinking and damaging of two destroyers, she sank or captured 34 merchant ships totaling . Conway's All the World's Fighting Ships 1906–1921 calls U-27 Austria-Hungary's "most successful submarine".

Summary of raiding history

Notes

References

Bibliography 

 
 
 
 
 
 
 

U-27-class submarines (Austria-Hungary)
U-boats commissioned in 1917
1916 ships
World War I submarines of Austria-Hungary
Ships built in Pola